Talavera aequipes is a small jumping spider that is found in Eurasia. It is very hard to distinguish from several very similar species, but is the most frequent of these spiders in Central Europe. It is small enough to reside comfortably in snail shells of down to 5 mm length during winter, where they also lay their eggs. Sometimes it shares a larger shell with Pellenes tripunctatus, where T. aequipes lives deep inside, and P. tripunctatus is found in the larger opening.

Appearance
The body is covered with brown to yellowish hairs, with striped legs. The female has yellow palps, the male has a yellow mask.

Distribution
The species is widely distributed in Europe, but is also found up to Eastern Siberia. It lives mostly on dry meadows.

Name
The species name is Latin for "equal feet".

Subspecies
The subspecies Talavera aequipes ludio (Simon, 1871) occurs only on Corsica. Earlier synonyms are:
Attus ludio Simon, 1871
Euophrys ludio Simon, 1876
Euophrys aequipes ludio Simon, 1937

References
 (1997). Kosmos-Atlas Spinnentiere Europas. Kosmos.

Further reading
 (1937): Les arachnides de France. Tome VI. Synopsis générale et catalogue des espèces françaises de l'ordre des Araneae; 5e et derniére partie. Paris, 6: 979-1298.
 &  (2003): A review of the genus Talavera Peckham and Peckham, 1909 (Araneae, Salticidae). Journal of Natural History 37(9): 1091-1154.

External links
Picture of a male T. aequipes
Diagnostic drawings

Salticidae
Palearctic spiders
Spiders of Europe
Fauna of Siberia
Spiders described in 1871